Galleh Peran (also Romanized as Galleh Perān; also known as Golpīrān and Gūlah Pīrān) is a village in Sokmanabad Rural District, Safayyeh District, Khoy County, West Azerbaijan Province, Iran. At the 2006 census, its population was 177, in 31 families.

References 

Populated places in Khoy County